Belfast Vital (formerly Tennent's Vital) is an annual music festival in Northern Ireland. It was first held near Botanic Gardens in 2002 then later moved to Ormeau Park in 2007, both of these venues were in Belfast. The festival had taken a noticeable undesired hiatus between 2008–2010 and returned in August 2011 at Ward Park in Bangor due to success of Ward Park as a venue for Snow Patrol's homecoming gig in 2010 which drew in an estimate crowd of 40,000. Sponsored by C&C Group plc and MCD Productions it was confirmed that the festival was set to return both in 2012 and 2013. In March 2017, it was announced via Facebook that the festival would return, with a new lineup, and under a new name as simply Belfast Vital or Vital, it is not yet clear if this is due to a withdrawal in sponsorship from Tennents or not, although there is nothing to suggest this and it is likely just a minor rebrand.

Notable headliners throughout the years have included Greenday, The Killers, Snow Patrol, Kaiser Chiefs, Kings of Leon, Franz Ferdinand, The White Stripes, Ash, The Streets, Primal Scream and Eminem.

History

2019 

Continuing under the name of Belfast Vital, Foo Fighters were announced to return to Belfast after a successful show at Vital 2012. They performed at Boucher Road Playing Fields on Monday, 19 August along with support acts Frank Carter & The Rattlesnakes, Hot Milk and King Nun.

2018

Continuing under the new name of Belfast Vital, Martin Garrix was announced to return to Belfast after a successful show in Belsonic 2017. He will play at Boucher Road Playing Fields on Saturday, 25 August along with supporting acts Steve Angello, Zara Larsson and others.

2017 

Under a different name of Belfast Vital, MCD Productions announced in March that Muse and Biffy Clyro would be headlining Day One of the festivals on Wednesday 23 August. Shortly after in April, it was announced Tiësto and Clean Bandit would be headlining Day Two of the festival on Saturday 26 August. This would be the second time Tiësto would headline a show in Belfast after Belsonic 2016 the year before at Titanic Belfast.

2016 

In March 2016, MCD productions announced Tennent's Vital will return to Boucher Road Playing Fields with the headlining acts of Red Hot Chili Peppers and Avicii on Thursday 25 August and Friday 26 August. This would be the second time Avicii has headlined Tennent's Vital and was also his last weekend of shows before retiring from touring.

2015
In early 2015, it was announced that Tennent's Vital would be back for another year at the Boucher Road playing fields with Calvin Harris headlining Day 1 and The Script returning to headline Day 2. This is the second time The Script have headlined the event following a headlining set on Day 2 in 2011.

2014
On 21 March 2014, Tennents Vital released an official statement confirming the festival would return in summer 2014. On 25 March, organisers confirmed via their official website, Facebook, Twitter and Snapchat that The Killers would headline the first day of the festival supported by Bastille. This will be The Killer's second time headlining the event following a headlining set in 2007, while Bastille are making their Tennents Vital debut this year.

2013
On 9 April, Vital officially announced its return, playing at the Boucher Road Playing fields again. The first act announced were Kings Of Leon, and on 11 June The Vaccines were announced as the main support act for the first day. On 13 May, Snow Patrol were announced along with singer/songwriter Foy Vance and Irish upstarts Kodaline, following day Jason Mraz was added to the bill. On 11 June, Vital announced its first-ever 3-day festival, with Avicii, Tinie Tempah, Rudimental and Tommy Trash playing on the 3rd day.

2012
On 8 February, Vital announced that they would be running "Tennent's Untapped", a platform to give rising bands an opportunity to make themselves known, with the winners securing a set on the Main Stage of the 2012 Vital concert.
On 5 March, Tennents Vital confirmed via Facebook that the lineup for its 2012 concert would be revealed live on Tuesday 20 March at its live launch party at a secret location, and also via its official website. On 16 March via their official Facebook page, Tennents Vital announced that the venue for the 2012 concert had been moved from Ward Park Bangor to Boucher Playing Fields, Belfast. On 20 March, The Stone Roses and Florence and the Machine were confirmed to be playing Wednesday 22 August, as confirmed via the official Tennents Vital Facebook page. The Foo Fighters and the Black Keys were also announced through MCD's official site. The Stone Roses leaked their announcement early via their Twitter page.

2011
BBC News reported that MCD Productions paid the previous debt in April while requesting permission for future events at Ormeau Park suggesting a strong possibility that Tennent's Vital would be back. This previous debt was due to gaining permissions to hold the concerts in 2010.

It was later announced on 12 May 2011 that Tennent's Vital will be held on 23 and 24 August in Ward Park, Bangor despite rumours of it being held in Ormeau Park. The official line up is due to be announced on Wednesday 25 May.

An advertising campaign began immediately. Power hosed advertisements appeared outside University of Ulster Belfast and Queen's University Belfast while Translink Metro services were used for regular advertisements with online banners on selected music-related websites.
On 25 May Eminem was formally announced to headline on 24 August. The remainder of the line up; both for support and the other day have yet to be announced.
Script and Two Door Cinema Club were confirmed as headliners for Day 1 of Tennents Vital(23 August). On 16 June, Vital confirmed on Facebook that Ellie Goulding and The Wombats will also be on the bill of Day 1.

2007
Moving Tennent's Vital to Ormeau Park allowed for the event to grow. Razorlight headlined the main stage on Tuesday 21 August while The Killers headlined on Wednesday 22nd. There was a combined audience of 45,000 across two days. BBC Northern Ireland featured the events live on air. The weather during the festival was fitting and there were no reports of serious crime except noise pollution calls within the nearby student housing area after the festival ended.

2006
Snow Patrol
Kaiser Chiefs
The Raconteurs
¡Forward, Russia!
Be your own PET
Duke Special
Ed Harcourt
Editors
Mumm-Ra
The Pigeon Detectives
Iain Archer
Oceansize
Republic Of Loose
The Crimea
Cursive
Rivals
Panda Kopanda
The Dangerfields
The View
Eamonn McNamee and the Holy Innocents
The Tides

2005
Kings Of Leon
Faithless
Franz Ferdinand
Maroon 5
Scissor Sisters
Jem
The Coral
The Futureheads
Driving By Night
The Cribs
The Brakes
Patiosounds
Dutch Schultz
Alloy Mental
Leya
the subtitles

2004
 
The White Stripes
The Darkness
Ash
New York Dolls
Jurassic 5
Peaches
Goldie Lookin Chain
The Answer
Acidtone
Blanche

2003
Zero 7
The Streets
Roger Sanchez
Death in Vegas
Richard Fearless
Roots Manuva
Nightmares On Wax
Jon Carter

2002
2002 was the first year of Tennents Vital and was located nearby Queen's University Belfast's PEC centre beside Belfast Botanic Gardens.

Primal Scream
Badly Drawn Boy
Idlewild
Snow Patrol
Gemma Hayes
Fatboy Slim
Stereo MC's
Pacha Futura

Organisation
The festival was launched in 2002 by Better Days, a Scottish events and promotion agency and sponsored by C&C Group's Tennents lager brand. management of the event moved to MCD in 2004. With the exception of technical and security staff, there were voluntary opportunities for most positions at Tennents Vital. Stewards are organised by charity Oxfam, which receives a donation in return for their work. Catering, and some retail services, are provided by various small companies, typically mobile catering vans. Significant logistical operations take place to bring people into the festival by public transport each year. In addition to extensive private coach hire by festival-goers, Translink implements additional bus and rail services to meet the increased demand.

See also
Belsonic
Radio 1's Big Weekend 2013

References

Rock festivals in the United Kingdom
Music festivals in Northern Ireland
Festivals in Belfast
2002 establishments in Northern Ireland
Electronic music festivals in Ireland
Music festivals established in 2002
Summer events in Northern Ireland